Vetrino Municipality is a municipality (obshtina) in Varna Province, Northeastern Bulgaria. It is named after its administrative centre – the village of Vetrino.

The municipality embraces a territory of 293.12 km², bordering the Shumen Province to the west, with a population of 5,702 inhabitants, as of December 2009. The southern parts of the area is crossed by the east operating part of Hemus motorway which is planned to connect the  port of Varna with the country capital – Sofia.

Settlements 

Vetrino Municipality includes the following 10 places, all of them are villages:

Demography 
The following table shows the change of the population during the last four decades.

Religion 
According to the latest Bulgarian census of 2011, the religious composition, among those who answered the optional question on religious identification, was the following:

A majority of the population of Vetrino Municipality identify themselves as Christians. At the 2011 census, 68.5% of respondents identified as Orthodox Christians belonging to the Bulgarian Orthodox Church. Muslims are the largest minority with 21.8% of its population.

See also
Provinces of Bulgaria
Municipalities of Bulgaria
List of cities and towns in Bulgaria

References

External links
 Vetrino Municipality info-website 

Municipalities in Varna Province